Medjå or Grong is a village which serves as the administrative center of the municipality of Grong in Trøndelag county, Norway.  It is located along the river Namsen, at the confluence with the river Sanddøla.  The Nordland Line runs along the eastern part of the village, stopping at Grong Station.  The European route E6 highway runs through the western edge of the village.  Grong Church, the main church for the area, is also located in this village.

References

Villages in Trøndelag
Grong